Cary Nelson (1946), is an American professor emeritus of English and Jubilee Professor of Liberal Arts and Sciences at the University of Illinois at Urbana-Champaign. He was president of the American Association of University Professors between 2006 and 2012.

Education
In 1967 Nelson graduated from Antioch College. In 1970, he received a Ph.D in English from the University of Rochester.  His scholarship of the 1970s and 80s worked to expand the canon of modern American poetry.

Career
Since the 1990s he has increasingly focused on issues in higher education. In the words of Alan Wald, "With the appearance of Manifesto of a Tenured Radical in 1997. Nelson became an example of the committed scholar who conceived of the advance of his own career in the context of the amelioration of the rank-and-file of the academic community; more specifically, graduate students, part-time employees, and campus workers."

From 2000-2006  Nelson was the second vice president of the American Association of University Professors (AAUP). He was elected to a two-year term as president and was re-elected until 2012.  
In April 2006 Nelson was arrested, along with over 50 others (including Jane Buck, the outgoing president of the AAUP), as part of a unionization effort by New York University's graduate teaching assistants.
In October 2015, Nelson stated regarding "frackemia" connections at the Leeds School of Business:"This is an example of complete collusion between the industry and academy that completely eliminates any sense of a university doing independent research. Unless the University of Colorado has a really lousy policy that basically says, ‘there ain’t no such thing as a conflict of interest,’ this is egregious."

Published works
He has published or edited twenty five books, including Manifesto of a Tenured Radical  and Revolutionary Memory: Recovering the Poetry of the American Left.  His academic focus is on modern American poetry.

Bibliography
 The Case Against Academic Boycotts of Israel (edited, with Gabriel Noah Brahm). Wayne State Press, 2015. 
 No University Is an Island: Saving Academic Freedom. New York University Press, 2010. 
  Israel Denial: Anti-Zionism, Anti-Semitism, and the Faculty Campaign Against the Jewish State. Indiana University Press, 2019.

Notes

External links 
 Cary Nelson's Home Page
 
 Perry Anderson's House of Zion: A Symposium - Fathom Journal

1946 births
Living people
Antioch College alumni
University of Rochester alumni
University of Illinois Urbana-Champaign faculty
Presidents of the American Association of University Professors